Masoala is a genus of flowering plant in the family Arecaceae. It contains the following species, both endemic to Madagascar:

 Masoala kona Beentje 
 Masoala madagascariensis Jum.

References

 
Endemic flora of Madagascar
Arecaceae genera
Taxonomy articles created by Polbot